The Arthur series refers to a series of fantasy novels for children written by Luc Besson, a film director and producer, and published from 2002 to 2005 in France, the United States and the United Kingdom. 

This term also refers to the feature films based on them, which Besson wrote, produced and directed. The films were made and released from 2006 to 2010, in France, the UK and the US. The series has also been produced in video game format.

Novels 
The four novels were originally published in France by Intervista. Later reissues by Le Livre de Poche have dropped the "Arthur et" part of the titles.
 Arthur et les Minimoys (2002, literally and in English as Arthur and the Minimoys)
 Arthur et la cité interdite (2003, literally and in English as Arthur and the Forbidden City)
 Arthur et la vengeance de Maltazard (2004, literally "Arthur and the Revenge of Maltazard")
 Arthur et la guerre des deux mondes (2005, literally "Arthur and the War of the Two Worlds")
Only the first two books have been published in English (translator: Ellen Sowchek) by HarperCollins in the United States and Faber and Faber in the United Kingdom. These two were reissued in one volume in 2007 by the latter publisher as Arthur and the Invisibles.

Films 

 Arthur and the Invisibles (2006) (also known as Arthur and the Minimoys), based on the two books Arthur et les Minimoys and Arthur et la cité interdite.
 Arthur and the Revenge of Maltazard (2009), based on Arthur et la vengeance de Maltazard.
 Arthur 3: The War of the Two Worlds (2010), based on Arthur et la guerre des deux mondes.
 Arthur, malédiction (2022) (literally translated to be Arthur, curse), a standalone spin-off horror film which many consider to be one of the worst films ever made.

The second and third installments, which were made back-to-back, have a directly continuous storyline but, in English version only, differ somewhat in the casting of the voice-only roles.

Video games 
Video games for the popular consoles of the time have been released alongside the first two films. The Arthur and the Revenge of Maltazard games have been distributed in the United Kingdom and under that name despite the film not being so.

 Arthur and the Invisibles (Game Boy Advance, Microsoft Windows, Nintendo DS, PlayStation 2)
 Arthur and the Revenge of Maltazard (Microsoft Windows, Nintendo DS, PlayStation 3, Wii)

Other media 
 Arthur and the Invisibles: Original Motion Picture Soundtrack
 A "4-D film", Arthur: L'Aventure 4D, has been an attraction at Futuroscope.
 In June 2014, the Europa-Park theme park in Rust, Germany was opened as Arthur – The Ride, an inverted-spinning dark ride based on the Arthur movies and characters. The ride includes audio-animatronics and projected footage from the films. The ride's cost was €25 million.

Notes 

Film series introduced in 2006
Adventure film series
Animated film series
Fantasy film series
Fantasy novel series
French film series
Series of children's books
Video game franchises
Children's film series
High fantasy novels
HarperCollins books
Faber and Faber books
French novels adapted into films
Novels adapted into video games